Flemington Racecourse is a major horse racing venue located in Melbourne, Victoria, Australia.  It is most notable for hosting the Melbourne Cup, which is the world's richest handicap and the world's richest 3200-metre horse race.  The racecourse is situated on low alluvial flats, next to the Maribyrnong River.  The area was first used for horse racing in March 1840.

Overview 

The Flemington Racecourse site comprises 1.27 square kilometres of Crown land.  The course was originally leased to the Victoria Turf Club in 1848, which merged with the Victoria Jockey Club in 1864 to form the Victoria Racing Club.  The first Melbourne Cup was run in 1861.  In 1871 the Victoria Racing Club Act was passed, giving the VRC legal control over Flemington Racecourse.

The racecourse is pear-shaped, and boasts a six-furlong (1,200 m) straight known as 'the Straight Six.' Races are run in an anti-clockwise direction.

The course has a crowd capacity of over 120,000 and contains three grandstands.  The biggest ever attendance was on Victoria Derby Day in 2006 when 129,069 people saw Efficient win the Victoria Derby. On 28 November, 1986, Pope John Paul II celebrated the Mass on the racetrack inner oval.  The racecourse has undergone a facelift in recent years, with the opening of a new $45 million grandstand in 2000 and the opening of a new members' grandstand in 2018.  It also contains a bronze statue of the famous racehorse Phar Lap, which was donated to the Club as part of Australia's bicentenary celebrations in 1988.  Also in celebration was the commission of Harold Freedman's seven panel mural which traces the History of Racing. The mural is housed is in The Hill Stand, built in 1977.

Flemington Racecourse was added to the Australian National Heritage List on 7 November 2006, announced during the 2006 Melbourne Cup. The site is listed on the Victorian Heritage Register.

Flemington Racecourse today hosts many of Australia's top races, including the Melbourne Cup, Victoria Derby, VRC Oaks, Mackinnon Stakes, Newmarket Handicap, Australian Cup and Lightning Stakes.

Transport 
The site has its own railway branch line, which operates on race days, bringing visitors to the adjacent railway station.  Originally, it was serviced by Salt Water River station, before that was demolished in the 1860s and replaced with a station on the present site.  Trains depart from platforms 8 and 9 at Flinders Street Station.
The No. 57 tram from the City (Elizabeth and Flinders Streets) stops at the Epsom Road entrance.

Car spaces for the disabled are available and taxi ranks are located adjacent to the main entrances.
Shuttle buses run from Epsom Road to the main turnstiles of the racecourse.
Lift access is available in the Prince of Wales Stand and to the first floor of the Members Stand.

Races 
The following is a list of Group races which are run at Flemington Racecourse. All races in metres.

Key
 hcp - handicap
 qlty - quality handicap
 sw - set weights
 sw+p - set weights with penalties
 wfa - Weight for Age

Gallery

See also 
 Australian horse-racing
 Melbourne Spring Racing Carnival

References

External links 
Victoria Racing Club - official website

Horse racing results at Flemington Racecourse

 
1840 establishments in Australia
Australian National Heritage List
Horse racing venues in Australia
Sports venues in Melbourne
Heritage-listed buildings in Melbourne
Tourist attractions in Melbourne
Sports venues completed in 1840
Flemington, Victoria
Sport in the City of Melbourne (LGA)
Buildings and structures in the City of Melbourne (LGA)